Neal M. Kurk (born June 8, 1940) is an American politician in the state of New Hampshire. He was a member of the New Hampshire House of Representatives, sitting as a Republican from the Hillsborough 2 district, having been first elected in 1986.

Kurk is a privacy advocate and is best known for drafting a constitutional amendment enshrining privacy into the New Hampshire Constitution. The Amendment reads, "An individual’s right to live free from governmental intrusion in private or personal information is natural, essential, and inherent." The Amendment was put to a general vote and secured 81% of the vote (the vote only requiring 66% to pass) and became part of the NH Constitution. The new Amendment has been used to challenge alleged government infringements on privacy including New Hampshire's vaccine registry and other government data collection programs.

References

Living people
1940 births
Members of the New Hampshire House of Representatives